Murdo MacKenzie (April 24, 1850 – May 30, 1939) was twice (1891–1901 and 1922–1937) manager of the Scots-owned Matador Land and Cattle Company, and founding president of the American Stock Growers Association, for whom he testified before congress and the Interstate Commerce Commission. His testimony led to passage of the Hepburn Act of 1906 which eased railroad fares for western shippers.

President Teddy Roosevelt appointed him to the National Conservation Commission in 1908, and it was Mackenzie, then manager of the Brazil Land, Cattle and Packing Company, with whom Roosevelt stayed when he visited Brazil in 1913.

Biography
MacKenzie was born near Tain, Ross-shire, Scotland, where he attended parish school and graduated from the Tain Royal Academy in 1869. He served in a law office and in the British Linen Bank, then as factor for Sir Charles Ross's estate at Balnagown Castle. He married Isabella Stronach MacBain in 1876 and fathered five children with her. Among these was his son, David G. (Dode) MacKenzie, who, in December 1909, was shot (possibly murdered) in LeBeau, South Dakota, while also working for Matador. 

He sailed to the United States in 1885 to accept an offer to manage the Prairie Land and Cattle Company in Trinidad, Colorado. After becoming a naturalized citizen, he was elected mayor of Trinidad in 1891, before accepting the directorship at Matador.

He died, aged 89, in 1939 in Denver, Colorado, where he is buried.

The town of Murdo, South Dakota was named for Mackenzie.

In 1981, he was inducted into the Hall of Great Westerners of the National Cowboy & Western Heritage Museum.

In popular culture
MacKenzie appears as a character in the fictional Scrooge McDuck comic book, The Buckaroo of the Badlands (1992), set in 1882, in which the poor, newly hired Scrooge, helped by Theodore Roosevelt, rescues a championship bull belonging to MacKenzie. In Raider of the Copper Hill (1993), set in 1884, Scrooge leaves Mackenzie to prospect for copper while his former employer drives his herd to Texas.

Notes

References
 Clarke, Mary Whatley, (June 1951) "Murdo Mackenzie", Cattleman.
 Douglas, C. L., (1939/1968) Cattle Kings of Texas Dallas: Baugh; reprinted Fort Worth: Branch-Smith.
 Hayter, Delmar J. 
 Pearce, W. M. (1964) The Matador Land and Cattle Company. Norman: University of Oklahoma Press.
 Pearce, W. M. 
 Blasingame, Ernest "Ike", (1958) "Dakota Cowboy: My Life in the Old Days". Lincoln: University of Nebraska Press.

American cattlemen
1850 births
1939 deaths
19th-century Scottish people
20th-century Scottish people
Scottish emigrants to the United States
Mayors of places in Colorado